Elmuez Mahjoub (born 14 August 1978) is the goalkeeper of the Sudanese football club Hay Al Wadi SC (Nyala) in the Sudan Premier League. He is also a member of the Sudan national football team. He is well known in his diving saves and his reflexes.

References

External links

1978 births
Living people
Sudanese footballers
Sudan international footballers
2008 Africa Cup of Nations players
2011 African Nations Championship players
2012 Africa Cup of Nations players
Al-Hilal Club (Omdurman) players
People from Omdurman
Association football goalkeepers